Cult icon may refer to:

Cultural icon
Cult image
Cult following